Bob Pratt is an inventor of cannabis consumption devices and a former aerospace engineer. His background in thermal testing for space applications helped him create a fast-heating vaporizer using a compact halogen light as a heat source. Pratt is a co-founder of Herbalizer, a company that develops vaporizers for cannabis use.

References 

American inventors
Businesspeople in the cannabis industry
People from San Diego
Living people
Year of birth missing (living people)